Nupserha annulata is a species of beetle in the family Cerambycidae. It was described by James Thomson in 1857.
The species is reported from Bhutan, India, Nepal and Pakistan.

Subspecies
 Nupserha annulata annulata (Thomson, 1857)
 Nupserha annulata mustangensis Holzschuh, 1990

References

annulata
Beetles described in 1857